Kaffraria, Kaffiria, or Kaffirland was the descriptive name given to the southeast part of what is today the Eastern Cape of South Africa. Kaffraria, i.e. the land of the Kaffirs, is no longer an official designation (with the term kaffir now an offensive racial slur in South Africa).

The districts now known as King Williams Town and East London were annexed by the British early on, and were thus known as British Kaffraria (later annexed to Cape Colony in 1865). 
All of the remaining Xhosa territory beyond the Kei River, south of the Drakensberg Mountains and as far as the Natal frontier, remained independent for longer and was known as Kaffraria proper.

As a geographical term it was later used to indicate the Transkeian territories of the Cape provinces comprising the four administrative divisions of Transkei, Pondoland, Tembuland and Griqualand East, incorporated into Cape Colony at various periods between 1879 and 1894. They had a total area of 18,310 km²., and a population (1904) of 834,644, of whom 16,777 were whites. Excluding Pondoland — not counted prior to 1904 — the population had increased from 487,364 in 1891 to 631,887 in 1904.

See also
 Ciskei
 Kaffrarian Rifles
 Transkei
 Xhosa Wars

References

External links
Thunder from a Clear Sky

Former subdivisions of South Africa